Tashfin ibn Ali (Arabic:تاشفين بن علي), was Marinid Sultan of Morocco from 1361 to 1362.

Life 
Tashfin ibn Ali assumed the throne in 1361 in succession to Ibrahim ibn Ali.
He was in turn succeeded by Muhammad II ibn Faris in 1362.

References
Citations

Sources

People from Fez, Morocco
Marinid sultans of Morocco
14th-century Berber people
14th-century Moroccan people
14th-century monarchs in Africa
1329 births
1362 deaths